Sughdiyon or Sugdiyan (formerly: Takeli) is a town in north-western Tajikistan. It is located in Mastchoh District in Sughd Region. The town has a total population of 2,700.

References

Populated places in Sughd Region